Johannes Anthonius Bernardus Metgod (born 27 February 1958) is a Dutch former professional footballer who works as assistant manager of United Arab Emirates.

Club career
Playing as a centre-back, Metgod started his professional career in the 1970s playing for HFC Haarlem. After one season with Haarlem, he moved to play for AZ Alkmaar, spending six years at the club, including their UEFA Cup final defeat against English side Ipswich Town, during which he scored a goal in the 4–2 second leg win.

In 1982, Metgod moved to Spain to play for Real Madrid. He then moved to England in 1984 to sign for Nottingham Forest, where he was a regular player for three seasons before signing for Tottenham Hotspur in 1987. He spent just one season with the North London club before he moved back to the Netherlands, where he signed for Feyenoord. He spent six years at Feyenoord before finally retiring as a player in 1994.

International career
Metgod won 21 caps for the Netherlands national team, scoring four goals.

Style of play
Metgod was noted for his free-kicks, particularly during his spell at Nottingham Forest.

Coaching career
After retiring Metgod became a coach, working for Excelsior Rotterdam and Feyenoord.

On 11 November 2008, Metgod was appointed first team coach by Portsmouth, but left the club on 8 February 2009 when manager Tony Adams was sacked.

On 21 May 2009, Metgod was appointed as a first team coach at Derby County, but left the club in October 2013 along with the rest of the coaching staff, following the dismissal of manager Nigel Clough.

In January 2014, Metgod was appointed as an assistant at Colorado Rapids.

In July 2014, Metgod was appointed as a scout at Brighton & Hove Albion.

On 1 July 2015, Metgod was appointed as a technical manager at ADO Den Haag and left in June 2016.

On 10 April 2017, Metgod was added to the staff at Granada CF by trainer Tony Adams, but left the club in May 2017 when manager Adams was sacked.

On 8 January 2018, Metgod was added to the staff at Nottingham Forest by trainer Aitor Karanka, but left the club on 10 January 2019 when manager Aitor Karanka resigned as coach. However, he continued at the club as a part of the board.

On 21 March 2019, he left Nottingham to become the assistant manager of United Arab Emirates national football team.

Personal life

Metgod was born in Amsterdam, Netherlands. Metgod's son, Dimitri, is also a professional footballer, playing as midfielder, whereas John's younger brother, Edward, is a retired goalkeeper.

Honours
AZ
 Eredivisie: 1980–81: runner-up 1979–80
 KNVB Cup: 1977–78, 1981, 1981–82
 UEFA Cup: runner-up 1980–81

Real Madrid
 La Liga: runner-up 1982–83, 1983–84
 Copa del Rey: runner-up 1982–83
 Supercopa de España: runner-up 1982
 Copa de la Liga: runner-up 1982–83
 European Cup Winners' Cup: runner-up 1983

Feyenoord
 Eredivisie: 1992–93; runner-up 1993–94
 KNVB Cup: 1990–91, 1992, 1993–94
 Johan Cruijff Shield: 1991

References

External links

Profile 

1958 births
Living people
Dutch footballers
Footballers from Amsterdam
Association football central defenders
Netherlands international footballers
UEFA Euro 1980 players
Eredivisie players
La Liga players
English Football League players
AFC DWS players
HFC Haarlem players
AZ Alkmaar players
Real Madrid CF players
Nottingham Forest F.C. players
Tottenham Hotspur F.C. players
Feyenoord players
Dutch football managers
Excelsior Rotterdam managers
Feyenoord managers
Portsmouth F.C. non-playing staff
Derby County F.C. non-playing staff
Colorado Rapids non-playing staff
Nottingham Forest F.C. non-playing staff
Dutch expatriate footballers
Dutch expatriate sportspeople in Spain
Expatriate footballers in Spain
Dutch expatriate sportspeople in England
Expatriate footballers in England
Dutch expatriate football managers